Sithole is a surname of Zulu origin, and may refer to:

Lucas Sithole (1931–1994), South African sculptor
Lucas Sithole (tennis) (born 1986), South African Professional Wheelchair Tennis Player
Edson Sithole (1935–1975), Rhodesian lawyer
Moses Sithole (born 1964), South African serial killer
Robert Sithole (1945–2006), South African musician
Ndabaningi Sithole (1920–2000), Zimbabwean politician
Petros Sithole, South African politician
Xoliswa Sithole (born 1967), South African filmmaker

Zimbabwean surnames
Zulu-language surnames